The Confederation of Turkish Trade Unions, known as TÜRK-İŞ, is one of the four major national trade union centers in Turkey. It was created in 1952 and is the oldest of the four centers, having been the only trade union organization to survive the 1980 military coup.

Today; TÜRK-İŞ is mainly known for their research and analyses of the Turkish economy. January 2020 research about cost of living for families in Turkey conducted by TÜRK-İŞ shows that monthly food expenditure (hunger limit) of a family of four required to afford a healthy, balanced and adequate diet is 2,219.45 TL.

In addition to food expenditure, the total amount of other monthly expenditures required for clothing, housing (rent, electricity, water, fuel), transportation, education, health and similar needs (poverty line) for the same date would be 7,229.49 TL.

TÜRK-İŞ claims a membership of 1.75 million, and is affiliated with the International Trade Union Confederation, and the European Trade Union Confederation. It is also a member of the Trade Union Advisory Committee to the OECD.

See also

 Confederation of Public Workers' Unions
 Confederation of Turkish Real Trade Unions
 Confederation of Revolutionary Trade Unions of Turkey

References

External links
 
 Trade Union Movement in Turkey Oral History Collection at the International Institute of Social History

National trade union centers of Turkey
International Trade Union Confederation
European Trade Union Confederation
Trade Union Advisory Committee to the OECD
Trade unions established in 1952
Organizations based in Ankara

Sources